Heras is a surname. Notable people with the surname include:

Ángel Heras (born 1958), Spanish sprinter
Henry Heras (1888–1955), Spanish Jesuit priest, archaeologist, and historian
Leo Heras, Mexican baseball player
Roberto Heras (born 1974), Spanish cyclist
Sol Heras (born 1987), English actor